Owen Dennis Ignatius Shannon (December 22, 1879 – April 10, 1918) was a professional baseball catcher. He played parts of two seasons in Major League Baseball for the St. Louis Browns and Washington Senators.

References

External links

Major League Baseball catchers
St. Louis Browns players
Washington Senators (1901–1960) players
Cedar Rapids Rabbitts players
Davenport River Rats players
Fort Scott Giants players
Rockford Red Sox players
Wheeling Stogies players
Marion Oilworkers players
Peoria Distillers players
Springfield Babes (baseball) players
Minneapolis Millers (baseball) players
Des Moines Champs players
Montgomery Senators players
Montgomery Climbers players
Mobile Sea Gulls players
Great Falls Electrics players
Butte Miners players
Baseball players from Nebraska
Sportspeople from Omaha, Nebraska
1879 births
1918 deaths